Mango Languages is an American online language-learning website and mobile app based in Farmington Hills, Michigan for academic institutions, libraries, corporations, government agencies, and individuals.  A Mango membership can be free at local libraries, or a membership costs $7.99 per month for one language or $17.99 per month for access to all 71 languages.

History 
Jason Teshuba, Mike Teshuba, Ryan Whalen and Mike Goulas founded the service in 2007. Jason Teshuba serves as the CEO of Mango Languages.

As of April 2019, Mango Languages offers 71 language courses. Additionally, the service offers English lessons in 17 languages and specialty courses to teach cultural differences. 

Mango Languages employs organic language acquisition and emphasizes learning grammatical principles through realistic conversations; features include interactive lessons, spaced repetition, reinforcement exercises, color-coded translations, video content, and Google Translate integration. Another feature allows users to record their pronunciation and compare a visual image of its waveform to that of a native speaker's. Courses are accessible from a web browser or an app, and progress can be synced across devices. 

In 2013, Mango Languages earned $7.9 million in revenue. In June 2019, Mango launched a new brand identity and released “major advancements to its platform,” including “new personalized, adaptive, conversation-based lessons in over 70 languages for web, iOS, and Android.” Mango Languages offers licenses for its software to libraries, schools and other institutions.

Languages
As of April 2020, Mango offered courses in the following languages:

Arabic: Modern Standard
Arabic: Egyptian dialect
Arabic: Iraqi dialect
Arabic: Levantine dialect
Aramaic: Chaldean
Armenian
Azerbaijani
Bengali
Cherokee
Chinese: Mandarin
Chinese: Cantonese
Chinese: Shanghainese
Croatian
Czech
Danish
Dari Persian
Dutch
Dzongkha (Bhutanese)
Filipino: Tagalog
English
English: Shakespearean
Finnish
French
French: Canadian
German
Greek: Modern
Greek: Ancient
Greek: Koine (Biblical)
Haitian Creole
Hawaiian
Hebrew: Modern
Hebrew: Biblical
Hindi
Hungarian
Icelandic
Igbo
Indonesian
Irish
Italian
Japanese
Javanese
Kazakh
Korean
Latin
Malay
Malayalam
Norwegian
Pashto
Persian
Polish
Portuguese: Brazilian
Potawatomi
Punjabi
Romanian
Russian
Scottish Gaelic
Serbian
Slovak
Spanish: Castilian
Spanish: Latin American
Swahili
Swedish
Tagalog
Tamil
Telugu
Thai
Turkish
Tuvan
Ukrainian
Urdu
Uzbek
Vietnamese
Yiddish

As a novelty, Mango also offers a short course in "Pirate."

See also
List of language self-study programs

References

External links
Mango Languages Website
Make Sentence From Words

Language-learning websites
American educational websites